Kalatrazan may refer to:
 Kalatrazan District
 Kalatrazan Rural District